Jebrayel    is a small town in Akkar Governorate, Lebanon.

The population in Jebrayel  is mainly  Greek Orthodox Christians.

History
In 1838, Eli Smith noted  the village, which he called Jibra'il, located east of esh-Sheikh Mohammed. The inhabitants were  Greek Orthodox Christians.

References

Bibliography

External links
Jebrayel, Localiban 

Populated places in Akkar District
Eastern Orthodox Christian communities in Lebanon